Evaristo de Macedo Filho, (born 22 June 1933, in Rio de Janeiro), known simply as Evaristo, is a Brazilian former footballer and coach.

Club career

Madureira (1950–1952)
Raised in the north of Rio de Janeiro, Evaristo, like many children, played football simply for fun on the streets, and watched Flamengo play on weekends with his uncle. In 1950, aged 17, Evaristo joined a friend who was attending a trial at Madureira and was asked to come back the following day. Signed as an amateur, he scored 18 goals in 35 games, including one against Fluminense at the Maracanã Stadium.

Flamengo (1953–1957)
Evaristo was called up to the Brazilian squad at the 1952 Summer Olympics in Helsinki. After returning home following elimination to an experienced Germany side, all of the Brazil players received new club offers. Turning down offers from Vasco da Gama and Fluminense, Evaristo joined Flamengo, and won three successive Rio State Championships with the club. He scored 103 goals in 191 games for Flamengo, including four during a 12–2 win over São Cristóvão, the biggest win ever recorded at the Maracanã to date.

Barcelona (1957–1962)
Evaristo's five-goal display with Brazil in a 9–0 win over Colombia at the 1957 South American Championship brought him to the attention of FC Barcelona technical secretary Josep Samitier, who had flown to South America in search of a striker. Samitier watched Evaristo playing for Brazil during qualification for the 1958 FIFA World Cup and, impressed, made Evaristo's father a proposal deemed "impossible to turn down", with a basic wage of 700,000 pesetas/£6,000 a year (about £140,000 in 2021). The offer came additionally including a house, a Mercedes-Benz, and a club liaison officer who assisted with Evaristo's marriage to his childhood sweetheart Norma three months later. Each player had an individual fan club arranged by the club, but the players outside of training and official activity were free to enjoy life and relax in the city.

Playing in a Barcelona side alongside László Kubala and Luis Suárez, and managed by Helenio Herrera, Evaristo scored in the first official match played at the Camp Nou in September 1957, and became the first player to score a hat-trick at the ground. In the following season, he scored three goals against European champions Real Madrid en route to Barcelona's first La Liga title in six years. On 23 November 1960, in the second leg of a European Cup tie against Real Madrid at the Camp Nou, during which the English referee ruled out four separate goals for Real Madrid, Evaristo scored a diving header with eight minutes to go, which eliminated Barcelona's rivals from the competition for the first time and ended their hopes of a sixth successive title. Evaristo scored six times during Barcelona's run to their first European Cup final, which they lost 3–2 to Benfica at the Wankdorf Stadium in Bern, now remembered as the "Square-Posts Final" due to the match supposedly being the reason the shape of the goalposts was changed.

During Evaristo's time with Barcelona, the club won two league titles, a cup title, and two Inter-Cities Fairs Cups. Barcelona's statistics department state that in official matches, Evaristo scored 105 goals in 151 games for the side, while the club's official site states in total he scored 181 in 237. Only Rivaldo, who scored 129 goals in 235 games between 1997 and 2002, has more official goals by a Brazilian for Barcelona than Evaristo; Evaristo however still retains the best goals-per-game ratio of any Brazilian to play more than 50 games for Barcelona.

Unfortunately, Evaristo's relationship with Barcelona with regards to international representation had been strained from the start. Having played every minute of a two-legged World Cup qualifier against Peru, and with eight goals in fourteen games, when they signed him Barcelona verbally agreed to release Evaristo for the World Cup final tournament in Sweden. However, with Spain having failed to qualify, the Spanish Cup went ahead at the same time as the tournament in Sweden, and Barcelona went back on their promise to release him. Brazil went on to win their first World Cup, with 17-year-old Pelé their headlining player; Evaristo would never wear the famous Brazilian yellow shirt again.

Real Madrid (1962–1965)
In 1962, wanting to sign another foreign player – yet with rules only allowing one per team under both Spanish and European rules – Barcelona asked Evaristo to naturalise as a Spanish citizen. After bitter wrangling, Evaristo agreed to quit Barcelona that summer. Although he had offers from clubs in both France and Italy, with his family happy in Spain Evaristo agreed to join rivals Real Madrid. In contrast to the transfer of Luís Figo 38 years later, Barcelona's fans directed their anger not at the player, but at the board. Despite a serious knee injury limiting him to just nineteen appearances and six goals for Real Madrid, Evaristo still won two La Liga titles in two seasons with the club.

Return to Flamengo (1965–1966)
Evaristo returned as he had planned to Flamengo in 1965, adding another league title before retiring a year later, at the age of 33.

International career
Evaristo competed for Brazil at the 1952 Summer Olympics, alongside other notable players such as Vavá and Zózimo.

Evaristo was capped by the national side fourteen times, scoring eight goals. He also holds the record of most goals for the Brazilian national team in a single match, with Evaristo netting five times for the Seleção in a 9–0 win over Colombia in 1957.

Evaristo played every minute of Brazil's two-legged 1958 World Cup qualifying tie against Peru, and with a total of eight goals in fourteen matches played, he was expected to be a starter for Brazil at the final tournament in Sweden. However, with Spain failing to qualify, the Spanish Cup went ahead at the same time as the World Cup, and Barcelona went back on their initial promise to release Evaristo for the tournament in Sweden; this soured the relationship between Evaristo and the club, and he would go on to join rivals Real Madrid, never playing again for the national team.

Managerial career 
Evaristo had a brief tenure as manager of the Brazil national team in 1985, and he later became head coach of Iraq for the 1986 World Cup. Evaristo would take on various further managerial positions, including three separate stints in charge of his former club Flamengo.

Club statistics

Honours
Flamengo
Campeonato Carioca: 1953, 1954, 1955, 1965

Barcelona
Inter-Cities Fairs Cup: 1955–58, 1958–60
Copa del Generalísimo: 1958–59
La Liga: 1958–59, 1959–60
European Cup runner-up: 1960–61
Small Club World Cup: 1957

Real Madrid
La Liga: 1962–63, 1963–64
European Cup runner-up: 1963–64

References

1933 births
Living people
Footballers from Rio de Janeiro (city)
Brazilian footballers
Brazilian football managers
La Liga players
Campeonato Brasileiro Série A players
Footballers at the 1952 Summer Olympics
Olympic footballers of Brazil
Catalonia international guest footballers
1980 AFC Asian Cup managers
1984 AFC Asian Cup managers
1986 FIFA World Cup managers
Brazilian expatriate footballers
Expatriate footballers in Spain
Brazilian expatriate sportspeople in Spain
Brazilian expatriate football managers
Brazilian expatriate sportspeople in Qatar
Brazilian expatriate sportspeople in Iraq
Expatriate football managers in Qatar
Expatriate football managers in Iraq
Campeonato Brasileiro Série A managers
Campeonato Brasileiro Série B managers
Brazil international footballers
Madureira Esporte Clube players
CR Flamengo footballers
FC Barcelona players
Real Madrid CF players
Fluminense FC managers
CR Vasco da Gama managers
Esporte Clube Bahia managers
Santa Cruz Futebol Clube managers
Qatar national football team managers
America Football Club (RJ) managers
Brazil national football team managers
Iraq national football team managers
Grêmio Foot-Ball Porto Alegrense managers
Cruzeiro Esporte Clube managers
Santos FC managers
CR Flamengo managers
Club Athletico Paranaense managers
Esporte Clube Vitória managers
Sport Club Corinthians Paulista managers
Association football forwards